Bunker 13: A Novel is a 2003 novel about an Indian journalist working on a weekly news magazine, who is investigating reports of corruption in some rogue outfits in the Indian army in the Kashmir sector. Drugs, sex and espionage are the central themes and is the first novel by Aniruddha Bahal. It achieved international attention and positive reviews.

The first edition was published June 2, 2003 by Farrar, Straus and Giroux.
It received the Bad Sex in Fiction Award from Literary Review magazine.

Plot

References

External links 
James Bond is a Choirboy (Jamie James, Time, June 30, 2003)
Aniruddha Bahal - Creating Another Tehelka (Avinash Kalla, The South Asian, August 2003)

2003 Indian novels
Novels about journalists
2003 debut novels
Second-person narrative novels